Widerøe is the third-largest airline of Norway and the largest regional airline in the Nordic countries. They operate a fleet of 41 Bombardier Dash 8 aircraft to forty-three domestic and nine international destinations. Owned by the SAS Group, Widerøe generates 40 percent of their traffic from public service obligations (PSO) with the Ministry of Transport and Communications. The company had a revenue of 2,500 million Norwegian krone, flew 380 daily flights and served two million passengers in 2012. The Bodø-based company has 1,300 employees.

Widerøe was founded in 1934. From the 1940s Widerøe started flying various seaplane routes for Norwegian Air Lines and later Scandinavian Airlines System (SAS). These routes were commonly flown using Noorduyn Norseman and de Havilland Canada Otter aircraft. From the mid-1960s a network of regional airports was built and Widerøe received the concession to operate the routes. The first four airports opened in Helgeland in 1968, followed by four in Sogn og Fjordane and Sunnmøre in 1971, three in Lofoten and Vesterålen in 1972, five in northern Troms and Finnmark in 1974 and another three by 1977. Originally these were served with the de Havilland Canada Twin Otter, supplemented with the de Havilland Canada Dash 7 from 1981.

Four additional regional airport opened in 1986 and 1987. The following three years Widerøe took over services at four airports from the failing Norving. Norsk Air was bought in 1989, making Sandefjord Airport, Torp a major base. The entire fleet was replaced with the de Havilland Canada Dash 8 between 1993 and 1995. From 1997 all subsidized routes became subject to PSOs, although Widerøe has been able to win most tenders. Except out of Torp, International scheduled flights commenced in 1994 and since Widerøe has provided a small range of international destinations as part of their network. Widerøe took over SAS Commuter's operations in Northern Norway in 2002 and SAS' operations in Western Norway in 2010.

Destinations

References

Bibliography
 
 
 
 
 

Wideroe
Destinations
Wideroe